Diaphania argealis is a moth in the family Crambidae. It was described by Francis Walker in 1859. It is found in Brazil, Peru, Ecuador, Venezuela and Costa Rica. The habitat consists of rain forests.

References

Moths described in 1859
Diaphania